Châu Hưng may refer to several places in Vietnam, including:

Châu Hưng (township), a commune-level town in Vĩnh Lợi District in Bạc Liêu Province
Châu Hưng, Bến Tre, a commune of Bình Đại District
Châu Hưng, Sóc Trăng, a commune of Thạnh Trị District

See also
Châu Hưng A, a commune of Vĩnh Lợi District